The Cambridge University Act 1856 is an Act of Parliament of the United Kingdom, which regulates corporate governance at the University of Cambridge. It requires that most members of full-time academic staff have voting rights over the Council of the Senate, which is ultimately the leading body in the university's administration.

Contents
Section 5, states that the Council of the Senate is the top management body.

Section 12, concerns "Votes of electors." It states,

‘In all elections of members of the Council every elector may vote for any number of persons, being heads of colleges, professors, or members of the Senate as aforesaid respectively, not exceeding the number of heads of colleges, professors, or members of the Senate respectively to be then chosen; and in case of an equality of votes for any two or more of such heads of colleges, professors, or members of the Senate respectively, the Vice-Chancellor shall name from amongst those persons for whom the number of votes shall be equal as many as shall be requisite to complete the number of heads of colleges, professors, or members of the Senate to be then chosen.’

See also
UK labour law 
UK company law
Universities in the UK

References
The Statutes: Second Revised Edition. HMSO. London. 1895. Volume 9. Pages 833 to 838.

External links
 legislation.gov.uk

United Kingdom labour law
United Kingdom company law
University-related legislation
United Kingdom Acts of Parliament 1856
History of the University of Cambridge
19th century in Cambridgeshire